Anaheim Regional Medical Center, formerly known as Anaheim Memorial Medical Center, is a 228-bed, acute care hospital in North Anaheim, California. It opened in 1958 and serves the greater North Anaheim, South Fullerton, La Habra and La Mirada areas. It was named one of the top 100 hospitals in the country for quality in the areas of heart attack care, heart failure care and pneumonia care.

As of July 1, 2009, this medical center is owned by AHMC, which also owns and operates Garfield Medical Center, Whittier Hospital and San Gabriel Valley Medical Center.

See also
List of hospitals in California

References

External links
 
This hospital in the CA Healthcare Atlas A project by OSHPD

Hospital buildings completed in 1958
Hospitals in Orange County, California